War of the Gods is an album by soul singer Billy Paul. The album was produced by Kenny Gamble and Leon Huff and arranged by Bobby Martin and Lenny Pakula. Released in 1973, the album reached number 12 on the Billboard soul chart and number 110 on the pop chart. The single "Thanks for Saving My Life" was a top 40 hit, reaching number 37 on the pop chart and was a top-10 soul record reaching number 9. In 2012, Big Break Records remastered and reissued the album on CD with bonus tracks and new liner notes.

Release and critical reception

A departure from Paul's previous work, War of the Gods contains only six songs, nearly all of which are extended psychedelic soul song suites fusing jazz, soul, funk, Latin, rock, and pop. In the new liner notes for the 2012 reissue, Paul calls it "the best album I've ever done in my life."

Stephen McMillian recounted Paul's appearance on Soul Train to promote the album: 

In addition to the hit single "Thanks for Saving My Life," the album's title track was released as a white label, promo-only single in two different, shorter forms. "War of the Gods (Part I)" was the A-side at 5:37 while "War of the Gods (Part II)" was the B-side at 4:42 (PIR single AE7-1080, 1973). The A-side is included as a bonus track on the BBR 2012 reissue. Also, "The Whole Town's Talking" was issued as a single in the UK (PIR single S 2225, 1974) and that shortened version of the album track also appears on the 2012 reissue as does the 4:00 single version of "I Was Married" (PIR single 3538, 1973).

In 2012, Paul called the album's title track his favorite of his own songs: "It's very spiritual, and it tells people about war. Me and Marvin Gaye were tight and he did 'What's Going On.' I said to him I have to do my version and I went for it. Things that had happened in my life had affected me, and I wanted to tell the world how important it was, how important people were and most importantly how important God was. If anything the song is even more important and relevant today. A lot of my songs have had that effect."
 
Joe Marchese of The Second Disc provided a detailed review of the BBR reissue, concluding: "Though War of the Gods isn't one of the singer or label's most accessible albums, it's doubtless one of the most provocative and passionate."

Track listing
All tracks composed by Kenny Gamble and Leon Huff, except where indicated.

Side A
"I See the Light" – (Kenny Gamble, Leon Huff, Bunny Sigler)  6:13
"War of the Gods" – 10:07

Side B
"The Whole Town's Talking" –  4:46
"I Was Married" – (Kenny Gamble, Leon Huff, Cary Gilbert, Joannie Arc) – 7:19
"Thanks for Saving My Life" – 2:58
"Peace Holy Peace" – 6:53

CD Bonus tracks (2012 reissue)
"War of the Gods (Part I)" (Single Version) – 5:37 
"The Whole Town's Talking" (Single Version) – 2:45
"I Was Married" (Single Version) (Kenny Gamble, Leon Huff, Cary Gilbert, Joannie Arc) – 4:00

Later releases
This album was reissued on the Super Audio CD format in September 2018 by UK label Dutton Vocalion, remastered in both stereo and Surround Sound from the original analogue tapes by Michael J. Dutton and released in a two-disc set with Paul's 1972 album 360 Degrees Of Billy Paul. The Surround Sound portions of the discs feature the Quadraphonic mixes of both "War Of The Gods" and "360 Degrees Of Billy Paul", made available for the first time in over 40 years.

Personnel
 Billy Paul – lead and backing vocals
 Bobby Eli, Bunny Sigler, David Bay, Norman Harris, Roland Chambers – guitar
 Eddie Green, Leon Huff – piano
 Vincent Montana, Jr. – vibraphone
 Anthony Jackson, Ron Baker – bass
 Earl Young, Norman Farrington – drums
 Don Renaldo – horns, strings
 Larry Washington – congas
 Lenny Pakula – organ
 Carla Benson, Evette Benton, Barbara Ingram – background vocals
 The Dandridge Choral Ensemble – vocals on "Peace Holy Peace"

 Roger Hane – cover artwork

Charts

Singles

References

External links
 Billy Paul – War Of The Gods at Discogs
 

1973 albums
Billy Paul albums
Albums produced by Kenneth Gamble
Albums produced by Leon Huff
Albums arranged by Bobby Martin
Albums recorded at Sigma Sound Studios
Philadelphia International Records albums